Jafarabad (also Romanized as Ja‘farābād) is a village in Jushin Rural District, Kharvana District, Varzaqan County, East Azerbaijan Province, Iran. At the 2006 census, its population was 25, in 4 families.

References 

Towns and villages in Varzaqan County